San Manuel, officially the Municipality of San Manuel,  is a municipality in the province of Tarlac, Philippines. According to the 2020 census, it has a population of 28,387 people.

The town of San Manuel is a typically rural community located at the northernmost horn of the Province of Tarlac.  Ilocano, Kapampangan and Pangasinan are commonly spoken, with Tagalog and English as official languages used for secondary education, business and governance. The municipality is known to have the best corn quality in the country which they celebrate every February during their Mais Festival.

From Manila, the town is accessible via the MacArthur Highway, or via the NLEX (North Luzon Expressway), SCTEX (Subic-Clark-Tarlac Expressway) and TPLEX (Tarlac–Pangasinan–La Union Expressway); it is the last town of Tarlac before entering the town of Rosales in the province of Pangasinan.

History
When the barrio of San Jose was separated from the town of Moncada to be proclaimed a sister municipality in 1909, they renamed it “San Manuel” in honor of their benefactor, Don Manuel de Leon.

San Manuel was originally covered with dense forest, lakes and creeks. Wild animals roamed into the wilderness. Settlers from Zambales and Pangasinan and later those from the Ilocos region inhabited into the area to start a new life.

The residents of this barrio then did not know which jurisdiction they belonged. There are four towns surrounding the area namely: Moncada in the south; Anao and Cuyapo in the east and Alcala in the north. Neither of these duly organized municipalities claimed the sprawling area. However, an incident in the barrio helped the people solved the “jurisdiction” problem. A man gathering bees fell from the tree and died. The people immediately reported the incident to the nearby localities but only the Moncada authorities came and investigated the incident. Spurred by the gestures of the people of that town, they joined and submitted themselves under their jurisdiction and finally became an integral part of Moncada.

Geography 
The Provinces of Pangasinan and Nueva Ecija border it on the north and east respectively, while on the southern side are the municipalities of Anao and Moncada.

Barangays
San Manuel is politically subdivided into 15 barangays.

 Colubot
 Lanat 
 Legaspi 
 Mangandingay 
 Matarannoc 
 Pacpaco 
 Poblacion 
 Salcedo 
 San Agustin 
 San Felipe 
 San Jacinto 
 San Miguel 
 San Narciso 
 San Vicente 
 Santa Maria

Climate

Demographics

Economy

Notes

References

External links

 San Manuel Profile at PhilAtlas.com
 [ Philippine Standard Geographic Code]
Philippine Census Information

Municipalities of Tarlac